Viktor Szentpéteri (born 1 November 1979 in Budapest) is former a Hungarian footballer who played as goalkeeper.

Achievements
FC Lahti 
Veikkausliiga: 3rd Position (2008) 
Europa League : Third Qualifying Round (2009)

References 
 
 
 HLSZ
 
 UEFA Official Website
 
 

1979 births
Living people
Footballers from Budapest
Hungarian footballers
Hungary youth international footballers
Association football goalkeepers
Újpest FC players
Rákospalotai EAC footballers
BKV Előre SC footballers
Dunaújváros FC players
Hungarian expatriate footballers
Expatriate footballers in Finland
Veikkausliiga players
FC Lahti players
Hungarian expatriate sportspeople in Finland
MTK Budapest FC players
Mezőkövesdi SE footballers
Dorogi FC footballers
Sliema Wanderers F.C. players
Nemzeti Bajnokság II players
Expatriate footballers in Malta